Liberia competed at the 2012 Summer Olympics in London, United Kingdom from 27 July to 12 August 2012. This was the nation's eleventh appearance at the Olympics since its debut in 1956.

The team comprised four Liberians: three athletes, and for the first time, one jukoda.  Among these athletes, American-born decathlete Jangy Addy was the only one to compete at his second consecutive Olympics. Sprinter Phobay Kutu-Akoi, a psychology graduate from St. John's University in New York, was the nation's flag bearer at the opening ceremony. Liberia, however, was unable to win its first Olympic medal.

Athletics

Liberian athletes have achieved qualifying standards in the following athletics events (up to a maximum of 3 athletes in each event at the 'A' Standard, and 1 at the 'B' Standard):

Key
 Note – Ranks given for track events are within the athlete's heat only
 Q = Qualified for the next round
 q = Qualified for the next round as a fastest loser or, in field events, by position without achieving the qualifying target
 NR = National record
 N/A = Round not applicable for the event
 Bye = Athlete not required to compete in round

Men
Combined events – Decathlon

Women

Judo

Liberia had 1 judoka invited, Liva Saryee. However, Saryee did not compete, as he received a bye in the first round and did not start in the second round. It later transpired that Saryee had been proposed for selection by the national judo federation despite never having taken part in any judo competition and being unfamiliar with the rules of the sport.

Men

References

External links
 
 

Nations at the 2012 Summer Olympics
2012
Olympics